Emilio Cassinello is a Spanish former professor and career diplomat.

Cassinello holds law degrees from the Universidad Autónoma de México and Universidad Complutense de Madrid and a Master in Laws from Harvard University. He was an assistant professor at the Universidad Autónoma de México, and at the Universidad de Madrid (1961-1963). He serves as the Director General of the nonprofit Toledo International Centre for Peace (CITpax).

Cassinello has held several posts in Spain's foreign service, including Ambassador to Angola (1978–79) and Mexico (1982–85). He also served as Consul General in New York (1998-2003).

References

National Autonomous University of Mexico alumni
Complutense University of Madrid alumni
Harvard Law School alumni
Ambassadors of Spain to Mexico
Ambassadors of Spain to Angola